The First Commissioner of Works and Public Buildings was a position within the government of the United Kingdom of Great Britain and Ireland, and subsequent to 1922, within the government of the United Kingdom of Great Britain and Northern Ireland. It took over some of the functions of the First Commissioner of Woods and Forests in 1851 when the portfolio of Crown holdings was divided into the public and the commercial. The position was frequently of cabinet level. The office was renamed Minister of Works and Buildings and First Commissioner of Works in 1940, Minister of Works and Planning in 1942, Minister of Works in 1943 and finally Minister of Public Buildings and Works in 1962. On 15 October 1970 the Ministry was amalgamated in the Department of the Environment.

List of Works Commissioners and Ministers

First Commissioners of Works (1851–1940)

Ministers of Works & Buildings and First Commissioner of Works (1940–1942)

Ministers of Works and Planning (1942–1943)

Ministers of Works (1943–1962)

Ministers of Public Buildings and Works (1962–1970)

Notes

References

Lists of British people
Defunct ministerial offices in the United Kingdom
1851 establishments in the United Kingdom